The 1919–20 Chicago Maroons men's basketball team represented the University of Chicago.

Regular season
The 1919–20 Chicago Maroons men's basketball season was the final of nine seasons for head coach Pat Page.  This group was first Big Ten champion in ten years for the Maroons.  The campaign began with a three-game home winning streak, a loss to Iowa, followed by a seven-game winning streak.  The team would play 12 conference games with only two defeats.  The Maroons were led by captain Paul Hinkle, who would go on to coach Butler University in basketball as well as football for nearly 50 years.  Complementing Hinkle at guard, the Maroons also started Herbert "Fritz" Crisler who also would create a legacy for himself as a coach and athletic director.  Additionally, the team rounded out the starting five with combinations of Clarence Vollmer, Robert Birkhoff and Ted Curtiss at forward, Harry Williams and Robert Halladay at center.

At seasons end, Paul "Tony" Hinkle, was named an All-American, while also being named 1st-team all-conference guard. For Hinkle, it was his second consecutive All-American honor and it was the third consecutive all-conference award. Crisler and Vollmer would be named to the all-conference honorable mention team for the 1920 season with Crisler being named defensive player of the year.

National Collegiate Championship Series
At the end of the regular season, Chicago sat at the top of the Big Ten and was considered the champion of the Western Intercollegiate Conference. Simultaneously the Penn Quakers had won the Eastern Intercollegiate Conference.  To decide the 1920 national collegiate basketball championship a series of three games was arranged between the two champions.  On March 22, 1920, the first game was played before a crowd of 3,600 fans in Bartlett Gymnasium.  The champions of the east would fall behind the Maroons at the half by a score of 17–6; however, the final score of the game would be much tighter at 28–24.  In the game both Vollmer and Birkhoff each scored 12 points, while Curtiss and Halladay each added a basket.

The second game was played at the University of Pennsylvania's gymnasium which was also the YMCA.  The Maroons were not equipped to play in a facility such as this and struggled to a 10–10 halftime score. But, in the end, the champions of the west would succumb to the Quakers and be defeated by a final score of 29–18.  In the game both Hinkle and Halladay would foul out as the Maroons would be the recipients of 20 fouls, allowing the Quakers to have multiple free throw opportunities.

The final game was played on the campus of Princeton University within the University Gymnasium.  Back on a familiar setting and playing on a semi-neutral court, the Maroons played a very close game.  In the end, the Quakers would come out on top by a score of 23–21 and win the Intercollegiate National Championship.

Roster

Head Coach: Harlan Page (9th year at Chicago)

Schedule

|-	

|- align="center" bgcolor=""

			

Bold Italic connotes conference game

Awards and honors
 Paul Hinkle selected as an All-American for the 1919–20 season.
Fritz Crisler achieved the Big Ten Medal of Honor following the 1921-22 season

References

Chicago
Chicago Maroons men's basketball seasons
Chicago Maroons basketball, men's
Chicago Maroons basketball, men's